Psacaliopsis is a genus of Mexican plants in the groundsel tribe within the daisy family.

 Species
 Psacaliopsis macdonaldii (B.L.Turner) C.Jeffrey - Oaxaca
 Psacaliopsis paneroi (B.L.Turner) C.Jeffrey - Oaxaca
 Psacaliopsis purpusii (Greenm. ex Brandegee) H.Rob. & Brettell - Oaxaca

 formerly included
see Roldana Senecio 
 Psacaliopsis pinetorum (Hemsl.) Funston & Villaseñor - Roldana pinetorum (Hemsl.) H.Rob. & Brettell
 Psacaliopsis pudica (Standl. & Steyerm.) H.Rob. & Brettell - Senecio nubivagus L.O.Williams

References 

Senecioneae
Asteraceae genera
Flora of Oaxaca